Michele Sindona (8 May 1920 – 22 March 1986) was an Italian banker and convicted felon. Known in banking circles as "The Shark", Sindona was a member of Propaganda Due (#0501), a secret lodge of Italian Freemasonry, and had clear connections to the Sicilian Mafia. He was fatally poisoned in prison while serving a life sentence for the murder of lawyer Giorgio Ambrosoli.

Early years
Born at Patti, a small comune (municipality) in the province of Messina (Sicily), to a Neapolitan father, a florist who specialized in funeral wreaths, and a Sicilian mother, Sindona was educated by the Jesuits, and showed very early in his life an unusual aptitude for mathematics and economics. He graduated with a law degree from the University of Messina in 1942. He then moved from Sicily to Northern Italy where he worked as a tax lawyer and an accountant for companies such as Società Generale Immobiliare and SNIA Viscosa, but immediately turned away from the law and began working in smuggling operations with the Mafia. He soon moved to Milan, and his skill and dexterity in transferring money to avoid taxation soon became known to Mafia bosses. By 1957, he had become closely associated with the Gambino family and was chosen to manage their profits from heroin sales.

International banker
Within a year of the Gambino family's choosing him to manage their heroin profits, Sindona had bought his first bank. He also became a friend of future Pope Giovanni Battista Montini; Montini was at the time archbishop of the Archdiocese of Milan and Cardinal. By the time Montini became Pope Paul VI, Sindona had acquired, through his holding company Fasco, many more Italian banks, and his progress continued right up to the beginning of his association with the Vatican Bank in 1969. Huge amounts of money moved from Sindona's banks through the Vatican to Swiss banks, and he began speculating against major currencies on a large scale.

In 1972, Sindona purchased a controlling interest in Long Island's Franklin National Bank from Lawrence Tisch. He was hailed as "the saviour of the lira" and was named "Man of the Year" in January 1974 by the US ambassador to Italy, John Volpe. But that April, a sudden stock market crash led to what is known as Il Crack Sindona (The Sindona bankrupt). The Franklin Bank's profit fell by as much as 98% compared to the previous year, and Sindona suffered a 40 million dollar loss. Consequently, he began losing most of the banks he had acquired over the previous seventeen years. On 8 October 1974 the bank was declared insolvent due to mismanagement and fraud, involving losses in foreign currency speculation and poor loan policies. Part of the losses involved Sindona's transfer of $30,000,000 of Bank funds to Europe to recover his losses.

According to the Mafia pentito (repentant) Francesco Marino Mannoia, Sindona laundered the proceeds of heroin trafficking for the Bontade-Spatola-Inzerillo-Gambino network. The mafiosi were determined to get their money back and would play an important role in Sindona's attempt to save his banks.

Ambrosoli murder
On 11 July 1979, Giorgio Ambrosoli, the lawyer who was commissioned as liquidator of Sindona's banks, was murdered in Milan by three Mafia hitmen commissioned by Sindona.

Sindona feared that Ambrosoli would expose his manipulations in the Banca Privata Italiana case. Shortly before he was killed, the American Mafia hitman William Arico, a convicted bank robber, invoked the name of Giulio Andreotti – the influential Christian Democrat politician close to Sindona – in a threatening phone call taped by Ambrosoli. Arico fell to his death while trying to escape from a federal prison in New York in 1984. Andreotti later replied in an interview that Ambrosoli "was a person who, in Romanesque words, was looking for it".

Prison and death
In 1980, Sindona was convicted in the United States of 65 charges, including fraud, perjury, false bank statements and embezzlement of bank funds; his defense was provided by one of the leading American lawyers, Ivan Fisher. The federal court in Manhattan, in addition to the 25-year prison sentence for the failure of the Franklin National Bank, fined Sindona $207,000.

While in United States federal prison, the Italian government applied for extradition so that Sindona could be present at the murder trial of Ambrosoli; this time the request was accepted and on 25 September 1984 and Sindona returned to Italy, imprisoned in Voghera.

On 16 March 1985, in the trial for the bankruptcy of Banca Privata Italiana, Sindona was sentenced to 12 years in prison for the crime of fraudulent bankruptcy. The compensation for the damages was established in civil court; Sindona was sentenced to immediately pay a provisional amount of two billion lire to the liquidators of the Bank and to the small shareholders who had filed a civil action lawsuit.

On 18 March 1986 he was sentenced to life imprisonment as instigator of the Ambrosoli murder. Two days after his life sentence, Sindona drank a potassium cyanide coffee (likely prepared by himself) in the Voghera prison; he died in the Voghera hospital after two days in coma, on 22 March 1986.

See also

List of unsolved murders

References

Sources

External links and further reading

Article (in Italian) on Propaganda Due

1920 births
1986 deaths
Deaths by poisoning
Deaths related to the Years of Lead (Italy)
Gambino crime family
Italian bankers
Italian fraudsters
Italian murder victims
Italian people convicted of murder
Italian people who died in prison custody
Murdered criminals
People convicted of fraud
People convicted of murder by Italy
People extradited from the United States
People extradited to Italy
Gangsters from the Province of Messina
People murdered in Italy
Prisoners who died in Italian detention
University of Messina alumni
Unsolved murders in Italy
Businesspeople from Sicily
1986 murders in Italy